This is a list of schools in Stoke-on-Trent in the English county of Staffordshire.

State-funded schools

Primary schools

Abbey Hulton Primary School
Alexandra Infants' School
Alexandra Junior School 
Ash Green Primary Academy
Ball Green Primary School  
Belgrave St Bartholomew's Academy
Burnwood Community Primary School
Carmountside Primary Academy 
Christ Church CE Primary Academy
Co-op Academy Clarice Cliff
The Crescent Academy
Eaton Park Academy
Etruscan Primary School 
Forest Park Primary School
Gladstone Primary Academy
Glebe Academy
Goldenhill Primary Academy
Grange Primary School 
Greenways Primary Academy 
Grove Academy
Hamilton Academy
Harpfield Primary Academy
Heron Cross Primary School 
Hillside Primary School
Holden Lane Primary School
Jackfield Infant School
Kingsland CE Academy
Maple Court Academy
The Meadows Primary Academy
Mill Hill Primary Academy
Milton Primary Academy
Moorpark Junior School
New Ford Academy
Newstead Primary Academy
Northwood Broom Academy
Norton-le-Moors Primary Academy
Oakhill Primary School
Our Lady and St Benedict RC Academy 
Our Lady's RC Academy
Packmoor Ormiston Academy
Park Hall Academy
Priory CE Primary School 
St Augustine's RC Academy
St George and St Martin's RC Academy
St Gregory's RC Academy
St John's CE Primary School
St Joseph's RC Academy
St Luke's CE Primary School
St Maria Goretti RC Academy 
St Mark's CE Primary School
St Mary's CE Primary School
St Mary's RC Academy
St Matthew's CE Academy
St Nathaniel's Academy
St Paul's CE Primary School 
St Peter's CE Academy
St Peter's RC Academy 
St Teresa's RC Primary School
St Thomas Aquinas RC Primary School 
St Wilfrid's RC Academy
Sandford Hill Primary School
Sandon Primary Academy  
Smallthorne Primary Academy 
Sneyd Academy
Star Academy Sandyford
Stoke Minster CE Primary Academy
Summerbank Primary Academy
Sutherland Primary Academy
Waterside Primary School
Weston Infant Academy
Weston Junior Academy
Whitfield Valley Primary Academy
The Willows Primary School

Non-selective secondary schools

Birches Head Academy
Co-op Academy Stoke-on-Trent
Discovery Academy
Excel Academy
Haywood Academy
Ormiston Horizon Academy
Ormiston Meridian Academy
Ormiston Sir Stanley Matthews Academy
St Margaret Ward Catholic Academy
St Peter's Academy
St Thomas More Catholic Academy
Thistley Hough Academy
Trentham Academy

Grammar schools
St Joseph's College

Special and alternative schools
Abbey Hill School
Kemball School
Merit Hospital School and Medical Pupil Referral Unit
Portland School and Specialist College
Watermill School

Further education
City of Stoke-on-Trent Sixth Form College
Stoke-on-Trent College

Independent schools

Primary and preparatory schools
St Joseph's Preparatory School

Senior and all-through schools
Excellence Girls Academy
North Road Academy

Special and alternative schools

Active Wellbeing School
The Beechfield School
Glebedale School
Intuition Holistic Education
Kinetic Academy
Peak Education - Stoke
Phoenix U16 Independent School
Rowan House School
Sporting Stars Academy
Want2Achieve The Academy

Stoke-on-Trent